USS Ross has been the name of more than one United States Navy ship, and may refer to:

 , a destroyer in commission from 1944 to 1959.
 , a destroyer commissioned in 1997.

See also
 
 

United States Navy ship names